is a railway station on the Tobu Utsunomiya Line in Mibu, Tochigi, Japan, operated by the private railway operator Tobu Railway. The station is numbered "TN-36".

Lines

Station layout
The station consists of two opposed side platforms connected to the station building by an overhead passageway.

Platforms

Adjacent stations

History
Yasuzuka Station opened on 11 August 1931.
From 17 March 2012, station numbering was introduced on all Tobu lines, with Yasuzuka Station becoming "TN-36".

Surrounding area
former Minamiinukai Town Hall
Minamiinukai Post Office

See also
 List of railway stations in Japan

References

External links

  

Railway stations in Tochigi Prefecture
Stations of Tobu Railway
Railway stations in Japan opened in 1931
Tobu Utsunomiya Line
Mibu, Tochigi